Christoph Bull (born August 27, 1966) is a German composer, musician and educator, and a Doctor of Musical Arts (D.M.A.) who was the first organist to record a complete commercial album at the Disney Concert Hall in Los Angeles California using the Frank Gehry co-designed Glatter-Götz/Rosales organ, 2010's "First & Grand Walt Disney Concert Hall Premiere Recording". Christoph is also the creator of Organica, a multi-media concert and recorded album series that has been performed regularly since April 1999. Dr. Bull has performed on several soundtracks for movies and television series, including the score for the 2016 remake of Ghostbusters.

Bull is currently the Organist in Residence at the First Congregational Church of Los Angeles, which houses one of the largest pipe organs in the world.

Early life and education 

Bull was born in Mannheim, Germany, where he began his musical education, piano and organ lessons, and performing. He studied music at University of Church Music in Heidelberg and Hochschule für Musik Freiburg, graduating summa cum laude with a major in scoring from the Berklee College of Music. He also studied organ at the University of Southern California, and organ and sacred music at the American Conservatory of Music.

First & Grand 
Bull's solo album, 2010's First & Grand, was the first time the Walt Disney Concert Hall organ in Los Angeles was used on a recording. The album features a cover of the John Lennon & Paul McCartney Beatles classic "A Day In the Life".

Track listing

Other musical ventures 
In addition to his work as a classical composer, performer and recording artist, Dr. Bull has released several collections of music and albums in a variety of styles from avant-garde and pop, to classic rock & roll and cocktail music.

His work has been featured in a series of compilation albums, including the benefit album "2 Unite All",  which featured his original song “Peace”. His song “Ali Ali Ali” was featured on the website for the collector’s book about Muhammad Ali by Taschen.

As a live performer, Bull is most widely known for performing at symphony halls around the world and classical music venues, including the Disney Hall in Los Angeles and the Segerstrom Center for the Arts in Orange County, California. But as an organist, he also performed at churches and religious centers throughout America, Europe and Asia. He has also been a resident organist at several high-profile churches including Blessed Sacrament Church in Hollywood, CA, most recently at the First Congregational Church of Los Angeles in Los Angeles, where is he currently the Organist in Residence. His mixed media show, Organica, which has featured a variety of artist but most regularly painter Norton Wisdom, has been performed on a wide variety of stages throughout America and Germany. Several Organica performances are also available as a recorded album.

Bull is also an accomplished rock musician who has performed at many of the world's most infamous rock music venues in America and Germany. His rock album Old School was released in 2001 and featured two classic rock covers by The Beatles and Bob Dylan, as well as original compositions. His 1999 Chromatic Records collaboration License to Chill is a collection of original lounge tracks co-written and recorded by Bull with drummer and programmer Larry Washington. The song "Martini Dry" was featured on PBS's History Detectives.

References

Living people
1966 births
Musicians from Mannheim
German composers
German organists
German male organists
20th-century German musicians
21st-century German musicians
21st-century organists
20th-century German male musicians
21st-century German male musicians